The PowerBook 140 was released in the first line of PowerBooks. It was the mid-range PowerBook, between the low-end 100 and the high-end 170. As with the PowerBook 170, and unlike the 100, this PowerBook featured an internal floppy drive. Codenames for this model are: Tim Lite, Tim LC, Replacements, and Leary. In 1992, it was replaced by the PowerBook 145, which was essentially a speed bump, though the PowerBook 160 essentially superseded it as the new mid-line model.

Features
Intended as a replacement for the Portable, the 140 series was identical to the 170, though it compromised a number of the high-end model's features to make it a more affordable mid-range option. The most apparent difference was that the 140 used a cheaper,  diagonal passive matrix display instead of the sharper active matrix version used on the 170. Internally, in addition to a slower 16 MHz processor, the 140 also lacked a Floating Point Unit (FPU) and could not be upgraded. It also came standard with a 20 MB hard drive compared with the 170's 40 MB drive.

The 140 was introduced with System 7.0.1, specifically to support new power management and other unique hardware features. However, due to the RAM prices in 1991, combined with its already high list price, the 140, like the 100 and 170, only had 2 MB RAM soldered directly onto the logicboard, which  critics felt was restrictive for use with System 7. Furthermore, since localized versions of System 7 were not yet available worldwide, the Japanese 6.0.7 KanjiTalk version of Apple's System software, was modified to support all three new PowerBooks and released as version J-6.0.7.1. As a result, this version was unofficially adapted for use with the standard 6.0.7 allowing many users to run System 6 on their PowerBooks, rather than upgrading on-board RAM with an expensive proprietary RAM card (a 2 MB card was US $300).

Design
Though released at the same time as the PowerBook 170 and PowerBook 100, both the 140 and 170 were designed entirely by Apple, while the 100 was miniaturized by Sony from the full-sized Macintosh Portable. As a result, the 140 represents the very first notebook computer created by Apple, with the 100 actually representing the first design improvements, though its internal architecture is the oldest in the series.

PowerBook 145
The PowerBook 145 was a speed-bumped 140, increasing the processor speed from 16 MHz to 25 MHz. The standard hard drive was upgraded from 20 MB to 40 MB. The 145 also introduced a new feature for the battery-conscious: users would be able to configure the 145 to sleep or completely shut down whenever the clamshell unit was closed. Though a direct descendant of the 140, the 145 was actually the replacement for the PowerBook 100 as the low-end model, the 140 having been superseded by the new mid-level PowerBook 160.

It was replaced by the PowerBook 145B in June 1993. The only codename for this model is: Colt 45.

PowerBook 145B
The PowerBook 145B was the same as the PowerBook 145 that came before it, but with a lower price and additional 2 MB of RAM soldered to the motherboard. The only codename for this model is Pikes Peak. 

Unlike previous Mac models but like the Performas, the 145B did not ship with a full set of system disks. System 7.1 was preinstalled on the internal hard disk, and a single system startup disk was included. The package also included two utilities that provide basic backup and restore functions. Although the 145B shipped with System 7.1, it can, in fact, run System 7.0.1, however it will incorrectly report as a 140 in “About This Macintosh...” 

The 145 was superseded by the PowerBook 150 as the next low-end PowerBook.

Specifications

Timeline

References

External links
 
 
 
 apple-history.com's section on the PowerBook 140
 PowerBook 140 at The Computer Resource 
 A prototype PowerBook 140.
 

140
68k Macintosh computers